Anna Johanna Rytting Kaneryd  (born 12 February 1997) is a Swedish footballer who plays as a midfielder for Chelsea in the Women's Super League and for the Sweden national team.

Club career 
Rytting Kaneryd started her career at Forsby FF in Köping.

After starting the 2014 season with Tyresö FF, making her debut in Damallsvenskan, gaining 5 appearances out of 8 matches played in the league, in June the club announced its withdrawal from the league due to lack of players and economic resources.  In July of that same year she therefore decided to accept Älta's proposal by signing a one-and-a-half year contract and leaving for Elitettan again.  In this period, however, she found little space, for her 5 appearances and a goal in 2014, but only 2 appearances in the following championship.

In February 2016, Rytting Kaneryd signed a contract with Djurgårdens.  With coach Yvonne Ekroth she made her debut with the new team a few rounds after her arrival in the meeting with Ilves in the Swedish Cup.  Later Ekroth gave her full confidence in her, using her as a starter in all 22 matches of the 2016 Damallsvenskan, where she shares with her teammates a middle-ranking championship finished in 6th place. Thanks to her performances during the season, at Fotbollsgalan 2016, Rytting Kaneryd was named "Årets genombrott" (revelation of the year).  She stayed with the club Stockholm also the following season, the team's new coach Joel Riddez continues to trust her, using her in 19 championship matches , also finishing 6th in the standings for 2017.

Ahead of the 2018 season Rytting Kaneryd was signed by Rosengård, signing a two-year deal.  On the same day the move was completed, she injured her cruciate ligament in a training session with Djurgården, causing her to miss the entire 2018 season.  On 1 November 2019 she captued her first career trophy, the 2019 Swedish Championship, and extended her contract for three years.  She played both home and away matches against Georgian side Lanchkhuti, scoring a goal in both matches.

However, before the expiry of the terms of the contract, in December 2020 she moved to Kopparbergs/Göteborg. On 28 January 2021 the company's passage under the control of Bollklubben Häcken was announced, thus becoming its women's section and taking over company logo and colors. Rytting Kaneryd therefore faces the new season in yellow and black gear.

In August 2022, she moved to Chelsea, signing a three-year deal with an option to extend for a further year.

International career
Rytting Kaneryd was called up by the Swedish Football Association in 2012, initially for the Under-15 team, making two friendly appearances before moving on to the Under-17 team that same year. Inserted in the squad with the team facing the first phase of qualifying for the 2013 U-17 European Championship, on this occasion she also scored her first goal with the national team, on 3 November, bringing the result with the teams to 2-1 level with Austria before they managed to equalize 2-2 before the end of the match.

Apart from a single appearance with the Under-18 team in 2014, Rytting Kaneryd has been in the squad with the Under-19 team since 2016, with whom, after two matches at the La Manga tournament, she played in the elite qualifying phase for the 2016 U-19 European Championship in Slovakia.

In the summer of that same year, she played for the Under-23 team, with which she faced the Nordic Cup, before a series of unofficial tournaments, remaining with the largest of the youth teams until 2020, earning 20 appearances.

Meanwhile, thanks to the first place obtained at the 2015 Under-19 European Championship in Israel, Sweden obtained the right to participate with an Under-20 team in the 2016 U-20 World Cup in Papua New Guinea. Inserted in the squad by the pair of federal coaches Calle Barrling and Anneli Andersen, after having tested her in a couple of friendlies, Rytting Kaneryd played in the tournament in all three matches for the national team in group A of the group stage. It was a 2-0 defeat against North Korea, in the 6-0 victory over Papua New Guinea, where she scored the Swedes' fifth goal, and in a 1-1 draw with Brazil, a national team who, despite finishing the group on equal points, already eliminated them in this phase due to a better goal difference.

On 19 February 2021, Rytting Kaneryd made her senior Sweden debut, in a 6–1 friendly win over Austria in Paola, Malta. She was a 61st-minute substitute for Fridolina Rolfö. Coach Peter Gerhardsson put her in the squad for the 2022 Algarve Cup, where the Swedes won first place.

Career statistics
Scores and results list Sweden's goal tally first, score column indicates score after each Rytting Kaneryd goal.

Honours 

 UEFA Champions League runner-up: Tyresö FF 2013–14
 Swedish league : Rosengård: 2019
 Swedish Cup : Häcken: 2020-2021

References

External links 
 
 Profile  at Swedish Football Association (SvFF)

1997 births
Living people
Swedish women's footballers
Sweden women's international footballers
Tyresö FF players
Djurgårdens IF Fotboll (women) players
FC Rosengård players
Damallsvenskan players
Women's association football midfielders
BK Häcken FF players
Elitettan players
UEFA Women's Euro 2022 players